Phosphide silicides or silicide phosphides or silicophosphides are compounds containing anions composed of silicide (Si4−) and phosphide (P3−). They can be considered as mixed anion compounds. They are distinct from the phosphidosilicates, which have the phosphorus bonded to the silicon. Related compounds include the phosphide carbides, germanide phosphides, nitride silicides, and antimonide silicides.

One preparation method is to heat a metal phosphide with silicon in a silica tube. Phosphorus must be prevented from evaporating. Another method is to use a liquid tin flux.

Phosphide silicides may be present as minerals. They are under investigation as photovoltaic materials.

List

References

Silicides
Phosphides